James Ross Snowden (December 9, 1809  – March 21, 1878 ) was an American politician from Pennsylvania who served as a Democratic member of the Pennsylvania House of Representatives representing Venango and Clarion counties from 1838 to 1843 and Venango, Jefferson and Clarion counties in 1844. He served as Speaker of the Pennsylvania House of Representatives in 1842 and again in 1844.  He served as the Treasurer of Pennsylvania from 1845 to 1847, as treasurer of the United States Mint from 1847 to 1850 and as director of the Mint from 1853 to 1861.

Early life and education
Snowden was born December 9, 1809 in Chester, Pennsylvania to the Rev. Nathaniel Randolph Snowden and Sarah (Gustine). He was educated at Dickinson College, received a Master of Arts degree from Jefferson College in 1845 and an honorary doctor of law degree from Washington and Jefferson College in 1875. He studied law, settled in Franklin, Pennsylvania and joined the Venango County bar in 1828.

Career
He was made deputy attorney general and was elected to the Pennsylvania House of Representatives for Venango and Clarion counties from 1838 to 1843 and for Venango, Jefferson and Clarion counties in 1844. He served as speaker of the Pennsylvania House of Representatives from 1842 and again in 1844. As speaker, he signed legislation regarding state debt, regulation of insurance companies, setting election districts and establishing funding for the education of the poor. He was state treasurer from 1845 until 1847, and was also elected colonel in the state militia.

Snowden developed an interest in numismatics during his work at the United States Mint, and became a noted numismatist of his day. He contributed to such publications as Bouvier's Law Dictionary, as well as publishing several numismatic books of his own. During his tenure as Mint director, he was noted for producing restrikes of older United States coins including the 1840s-1850s half cents, 1827 quarter, 1856 Flying Eagle cent and Gobrecht dollars of 1836-39, which he sold to collectors to finance the Mint's own collection. He also oversaw the reconstruction of the Mint building and adding fireproofing.

In 1850, he returned to the practice of law in Pittsburgh, Pennsylvania and worked as a solicitor for the Pennsylvania Railroad Company.

In 1861, he became prothonotary of the Supreme Court of Pennsylvania.

During the American Civil War, Snowden served as lieutenant colonel for the Philadelphia First Regiment of Home Guards but never saw active duty.

He died on March 21, 1878 in Hulmeville, Pennsylvania and was interred at Laurel Hill Cemetery in Philadelphia, Pennsylvania.

Family
He married Susan Engle Patterson in 1848 and together they had five children. His great-grandfather, Nathanael Fitz Randolph, served in the American Revolutionary War, known as "Fighting Nat," and was presented with a sword by the legislature of New Jersey. He also started the first subscription paper for Princeton College, and gave the ground upon which Nassau Hall, the first edifice of that college, was built. His father was curator of Dickinson College from 1794 until 1827. His nephew A. Loudon Snowden became superintendent of the Philadelphia office of the United States Mint.

Published works
A Measure Proposed to Secure to the People a Safe Treasury and a Sound Currency, Benjamin F. Mifflin, Philadelphia, 1857
A Description of Ancient and Modern Coins in the Cabinet Collection at the Mint of the United States, J.B. Lippincott & Co., Philadelphia, 1860
A Description of the Medals of Washington; of National and Miscellaneous Medals; and of Other Objects of Interest in the Museum of the Mint., J.B. Lippincott & Co., Philadelphia, 1861
The Mint at Philadelphia (1861)
The Coins of the Bible, and its Money Terms., Presbyterian Board of Publication, Philadelphia, 1864
The Cornplanter Memorial. An Historical Sketch of Gy-ant-wa-chia - the Cornplanter, and of the Six Nations of Indians., Singerly & Myers, Harrisburg, 1867

He contributed articles on the coin of the United States to the National Almanac of 1873.

References

External links

1809 births
1878 deaths
19th-century American male writers
19th-century American politicians
American numismatists
Burials at Laurel Hill Cemetery (Philadelphia)
Dickinson College alumni
Directors of the United States Mint
Lincoln administration personnel
Pennsylvania lawyers
Pennsylvania prothonotaries
People from Chester, Pennsylvania
Pierce administration personnel
Speakers of the Pennsylvania House of Representatives
Democratic Party members of the Pennsylvania House of Representatives
State treasurers of Pennsylvania
Washington & Jefferson College alumni